Charles Frank Oertel (March 12, 1931 – October 4, 2000) was an American professional baseball player who appeared in almost 1,200 games in the minor leagues, but only 14 contests in Major League Baseball (MLB) for the Baltimore Orioles in , mostly as a pinch hitter.

Oertel spent ten seasons (1950 through 1961, with 1952 and 1953 missed due to Korean War military service) in the same organization. He signed with the then-St. Louis Browns and remained in the club's farm system when it became the Orioles in 1954. He was recalled to Baltimore's expanded, 40-man roster in September 1958 after he batted .313 with 160 hits for the Triple-A Louisville Colonels. In his debut on September 1 against the Washington Senators at Griffith Stadium, he replaced Joe Taylor in right field in the fifth inning. Not batting until the eighth frame, Oertel singled off Hal Griggs in his first MLB plate appearance. He would get only one more hit in the major leagues, but it was a home run against future Hall of Fame pitcher Jim Bunning on September 13.

Of Oertel's 14 games played, nine came as a pinch hitter and three as a pinch runner. He played in two games and ten total innings as an outfielder, but he never started a game. With this two hits in 12 at bats, he hit .167 lifetime; his solo shot off Bunning accounted for his only run batted in. As a baserunner, he tallied four times.

Oertel returned to the minors in 1959 and played the rest of his pro career at Triple-A.  He died in Royal Oak, Michigan, at the age of 69.

References

Sources

1931 births
2000 deaths
Appleton Papermakers players
Baltimore Orioles players
Baseball players from Kansas
Hazlehurst-Baxley Red Sox players
Louisville Colonels (minor league) players
Major League Baseball outfielders
Miami Marlins (IL) players
People from Coffeyville, Kansas
Rochester Red Wings players
San Antonio Missions players
Vancouver Mounties players